The year 1838 in science and technology involved some significant events, listed below.

Astronomy
 Friedrich Wilhelm Bessel makes the first accurate measurement of distance to a star, 61 Cygni, using parallax. Thomas Henderson (Alpha Centauri) and Friedrich Georg Wilhelm Struve (Vega) announce their measurements using parallax shortly afterwards.
 Claude Servais Mathias Pouillet makes the first quantitative measurements of the heat emitted by the Sun.
 Peter Andreas Hansen publishes a revision of the lunar theory, Fundamenta nova investigationis orbitae verae quam luna perlustrat.

Biology

 May 9 – Royal Agricultural Society of England established.
 Proteins discovered by Gerardus Johannes Mulder and named by Jöns Jakob Berzelius.
 Matthias Schleiden discovers that all living plant tissue is composed of cells.
 Andrew Smith begins publication of Illustrations of the Zoology of South Africa.

Chemistry
 Bulat steel alloy developed by Pavel Petrovich Anosov.
 Electrotyping is invented by Moritz von Jacobi in Russia.

Exploration
 August 18 – The United States Exploring Expedition under U.S. Navy Lieutenant Charles Wilkes sets sail for a four-year circumnavigation westabout.
 In Australia, Charles Sturt proves that the Hume and Murray are the same river.

Mathematics
 Augustus De Morgan introduces the term 'mathematical induction'.
 S. D. Poisson publishes Recherches sur la probabilité des jugements en matière criminelle et en matière civile, containing his work on probability theory and introducing Poisson distribution.

Medicine
 Jean Esquirol publishes Des maladies mentales considerées sous le rapport médicale, hygiènique et médico-legal in Paris. This includes the first description of what will later become known as Down syndrome.
 John Gorrie experiments with cooling the hospital wards of malarial patients in Apalachicola, Florida.

Technology
 January 6 – Samuel Morse first publicly demonstrates the electrical telegraph.
 April 4–22 – The paddle steamer SS Sirius (1837) makes the Transatlantic Crossing to New York from Cork, Ireland, in eighteen days, though not using steam continuously.
 April 8–23 – Isambard Kingdom Brunel's paddle steamer  (1838) makes the Transatlantic Crossing to New York from Avonmouth, England, in fifteen days, inaugurating a regular steamship service.
 Liverpool-built barque Ironsides becomes the first large ocean-going iron ship.
 William Barnett obtains a United Kingdom patent for an internal combustion engine, the first with compression of the gas/air mixture in the cylinder.
 David Bruce, Jr., invents the Pivotal Typecaster, which replaces hand typecasting in printing.
 The first screw-pile lighthouse is built by Alexander Mitchell on Maplin Sands in the Thames Estuary.
 Charles Wheatstone originates the stereoscope.

Events
 A statue of English chemist and physicist John Dalton (in marble by Sir Francis Chantrey) is erected in Manchester during the scientist's lifetime.

Awards
 Copley Medal: Carl Friedrich Gauss; Michael Faraday
 Wollaston Medal: Richard Owen

Births
 January 5 – Camille Jordan (died 1922), French mathematician.
 January 29 – Edward W. Morley (died 1923), American chemist.
 February 18 – Ernst Mach (died 1916), Austrian physicist.
 March 3 – George William Hill (died 1914), American astronomer.
 March 12 – William H. Perkin (died 1907), English chemist.
 March 15 – Alice Cunningham Fletcher (died 1923), Cuban-born American ethnologist, anthropologist and social scientist.
 April 8 – Ferdinand von Zeppelin (died 1917), German founder of the Zeppelin airship company.
 April 16 – Ernest Solvay (died 1922), Belgian chemist.
 April 18 – Paul-Émile Lecoq de Boisbaudran (died 1912), French chemist.
 April 21 – John Muir (died 1914), Scottish-born American naturalist.
 May 6 – Alexandra Smirnoff (died 1913), Finnish pomologist.
 June 4 – John Grigg (died 1920), New Zealand astronomer.
 July 19 – Joel Asaph Allen (died 1921), American zoologist.
 August 6 – George James Symons (died 1900), English meteorologist.
 December 12 – Sherburne Wesley Burnham (died 1921), American astronomer.

Deaths
 March 16 – Nathaniel Bowditch (born 1773), American mathematician.
 April 6 – José Bonifácio de Andrada (born 1763), Brazilian statesman and mineralogist.
 July 5 – Jean Marc Gaspard Itard (born 1774), French otorhinolaryngologist.
 August 21 – Adelbert von Chamisso (born 1781), German botanist.
 September 1 – William Clark (born 1770), American explorer.
 September 27 – Bernard Courtois (born 1777), French chemist.
 October 1 – Charles Tennant (born 1768), Scottish chemist and industrialist.

References

 
19th century in science
1830s in science